Albert Leroy Aylmer (March 29, 1885 – January 10, 1970) was an American politician who served as Mayor and later City Attorney of Compton, California.

Biography

Albert Leroy Aylmer was born March 29, 1885, in North Dakota, an attorney by trade.

Political career

In the wake of C. S. Smith's 1936 recall, Aylmer became Mayor of Compton.  After serving as mayor, Aylmer was elected City Attorney in 1949.  However, he was so unpopular that four years later when he was up for re-election, he finished third in the primary.

He died January 10, 1970, in Los Angeles County, California.

References 

Mayors of Compton, California
1885 births
1970 deaths
20th-century American politicians